Glyphipterix fortunatella is a moth of the  family Glyphipterigidae. It is found on the Canary Islands.

The wingspan is 6-6.5 mm. The forewings are bronzy fuscous, blending to brownish cupreous beyond the middle. The hindwings are bronzy grey.

References

Moths described in 1908
Glyphipterigidae
Moths of Africa